Halswell was a parliamentary electorate in Christchurch, New Zealand from 1890 to 1893. It was represented by one Member of Parliament during that time.

Population centres
In December 1887, the House of Representatives voted to reduce its membership from general electorates from 91 to 70. The 1890 electoral redistribution used the same 1886 census data used for the 1887 electoral redistribution. In addition, three-member electorates were introduced in the four main centres.

The area of the Halswell electorate was classed as fully rural (i.e. no boroughs within its area had a population of more than 2,000 people), and the maximum country quota of 28% thus applied. The electorate was named after Halswell near Christchurch. In the 1890 election, polling booths were in Halswell, Tai Tapu, Templeton, Addington, Prebbleton and Fendalton. Other settlements that fell within the electorate's boundaries were Yaldhurst, Islington, Oaklands, Ladbrooks, and Lincoln.

History
The Halswell electorate was formed for the 1890 election, which determined the composition of the 11th Parliament.

The electorate was represented by one Member of Parliament, William Rolleston. The 1890 election was contested by Rolleston and Francis Samuel Parker.  Rolleston and Parker received 748 and 548 votes, respectively.

Rolleston remained a member during the term of the term of the 11th Parliament.

Members of Parliament
Key

Election results

1890 election

Notes

References

1890 establishments in New Zealand
1893 disestablishments in New Zealand
Historical electorates of New Zealand
Politics of Christchurch
History of Christchurch